"I Can't Get No Sleep" is a song by Swiss singer-songwriter Luca Hänni and DJ Christopher S. It was written by Mathias Ramson, Michael Keller and Michel Lüchinger and produced by the latter for Hänni's third studio album Dance Until We Die (2014). Released as the album's lead single on 11 April 2014, it peaked at number 24 on the Swiss Singles Chart.

Music video
A music video to accompany the release of "I Can't Get No Sleep" was first released onto YouTube on 10 August 2014 at a total length of three minutes and forty-five seconds.

Charts

Release history

References

2014 singles
2014 songs
Luca Hänni songs